The UKCDFF (formerly known as National Festival of Community Theatre), established in 1927, is a United Kingdom-based celebration of amateur theatre at the local, national and UK level. Each year, the national amateur organisations in the home nations promote a series of one-act play festivals and, through various eliminating rounds, take part in the final stage. The final stage is called the British Final Festival of One Act Plays, and includes companies and enthusiasts from all over the UK. A Standing Committee of representatives of the four countries has overall control of the Festival, with each country in turn taking the responsibility for organising it.

The four partners in the United Kingdom Community Drama Festivals Federation are:
 All-England Theatre Festival (AETF)
 Association of Ulster Drama Festivals (AUDF)
 Association of Wales (DAW)
 Scottish Community Drama Association (SCDA)

The festivals provide an opportunity for amateur companies to appear in new and varying venues before widely differing audiences, to receive constructive criticism from a qualified adjudicator (GoDA), and to compare the standard of their own work with that of the other companies taking part. For audiences, the public adjudication of performances offers a deeper understanding and appreciation of theatre.

The productions from Scotland, England, Wales and Northern Ireland will all have been publicly adjudicated at each stage. The overall winner receives the Howard de Walden Ewer award.

Structure
Local festivals lead selected companies to a National Final Festival in each country, from which one company is selected to represent its country at the British Final Festival. All four annual rotating host countries of the Final remain in contact throughout the eliminating competition.
 England - All-England Theatre Festival
 Wales - Wales Final Festival of One Act Plays
 Scotland - SCDA Festival
 Northern Ireland - Ulster One-Act Finals

British Final Festival of One Act Plays - results
The winners of the festival are presented with the Howard de Walden Trophy.

References

External links
 

Theatre festivals in England
1927 establishments in England
Festivals established in 1927